Chowdhury Akmal Ibne Yusuf (1945/1946 – 19 December 2021) was a Bangladesh Nationalist Party politician and served as a Jatiya Sangsad member twice representing the Faridpur-4 constituency in 1996 and again during 2002–2006. He died on 19 December 2021, at the age of 75.

References

1940s births
2021 deaths
Year of birth missing
Place of birth missing
6th Jatiya Sangsad members
8th Jatiya Sangsad members
Bangladesh Nationalist Party politicians
People from Faridpur District